Kranichfeld is a town in the Weimarer Land district, in Thuringia. It is situated on the river Ilm, 18 km southeast of Erfurt, and 16 km southwest of Weimar.

History
Within the German Empire (1871-1918), Kranichfeld was part of the Grand Duchy of Saxe-Weimar-Eisenach.

References

Towns in Thuringia
Weimarer Land
Grand Duchy of Saxe-Weimar-Eisenach